Yoon Seon-ho (born November 8, 1995) is a South Korean football player. He plays for Ansan Greeners.

Career
Yoon Seon-ho joined J2 League club Kamatamare Sanuki in 2017.

References

External links

|

1995 births
Living people
South Korean footballers
South Korean expatriate sportspeople in Japan
South Korean expatriate footballers
J2 League players
Kamatamare Sanuki players
Ansan Greeners FC players
Association football defenders
Expatriate footballers in Japan